Sibi Junction Railway Station (Balochi: سبی جنکشن ریلوے اسٹیشن) is located in Sibi, Balochistan, Pakistan. It is staffed and has a booking office. The station served as the junction between the Rohri-Chaman Railway Line and Kandahar State Railway.

Services
The following trains stop at Sibi Junction station:

See also
 List of railway stations in Pakistan
 Pakistan Railways
 Quetta Railway Station
 Rawalpindi Railway Station
 Larkana Railway Station

References

External links

Railway stations in Sibi District
Railway stations on Rohri–Chaman Railway Line
Railway stations on Kandahar State Railway Line